O Sowthapuram is a village panchayat in Vennandur block of Namakkal District in Tamilnadu.

Health
Primary Health Center

Transport

Road
Connect Salem city and villages in Vennandur block with O Sowthapuram by TNSTC bus service No:51.

References

Vennandur block